Dalton Red Wolves SC are an American soccer club in Dalton, Georgia competing in the USL League Two. They are an affiliate team of USL League One club Chattanooga Red Wolves.

History
The club was founded in 2018 by the Chattanooga Red Wolves to serve as one of their affiliate clubs. The Park City Red Wolves were formed at the same time, as another affiliate. Both affiliates would operate as U23 teams and play in the fourth tier USL League Two. Dalton plans to use primarily local talent to make up their roster. They finished 3rd in the Deep South division in their inaugural season, missing out on the opportunity to qualify for the 2020 U.S. Open Cup. The club will be moving to a new stadium in nearby East Ridge, Tennessee when construction finishes.

Year-by-year

References

External links
 

USL League Two teams
Association football clubs established in 2018
Soccer clubs in Georgia (U.S. state)
2020 establishments in Georgia (U.S. state)